Biathlon at the 1998 Winter Olympics consisted of six biathlon events. They were held at Nozawa Onsen.  The events began on 9 February and ended on 21 February 1998.

Medal summary
Eight nations won medals in biathlon, with Norway leading the medal table, thanks to five medals, 2 gold, the same as Germany. Uschi Disl was the only individual to win three medals, one of each type. Ole Einar Bjørndalen and Halvard Hanevold led the men's table, with one gold and one silver each.

Medal table

Men's events

Women's events

Participating nations
Thirty-two nations sent biathletes to compete in the events. Below is a list of the competing nations; in parentheses are the number of national competitors.

See also
 Biathlon at the 1998 Winter Paralympics

References

 
1998 in biathlon
1998 Winter Olympics events
1998
Biathlon competitions in Japan